A diktat is a statute, harsh penalty or settlement imposed upon a defeated party by the victor, or a dogmatic decree. The term has acquired a pejorative sense, to describe a set of rules dictated by a foreign power or an unpopular local power. The phrases "To impose its values" or "give orders" can be synonymous with giving a diktat. An example of firman or Royal Diktat was the one issued by Mughal Emperor Farrukhsiyar in 1717, exempting the British from the payment of customs duties in Bengal.

Origins
The term is from German, derived from the Latin past participle dictātum. 
It arose from Dictatus Papae, which attempts to resolve the struggle of the priesthood and the Empire in the Holy Roman Empire.

Historical use
The term was first noted in 1922 by Wilhelm, Crown Prince of Prussia, regarding the Treaty of Versailles imposed on the defeated Germany. It was referred to as such because its terms were presented to Germany without allowing it to negotiate its terms. Other occurrences in Germany were the Treaty of Saint-Germain in 1919 and the Treaties of Tilsit in 1807, and in Czech and Slovak for the 1938 Munich Agreement and 1940 Salzburg Conference.

However, the term came into popular journalism use during the years of the Cold War where there was talk of the politburo diktats from Moscow to describe and characterize the commands by the bureaucrats of the former USSR towards its satellite countries.

It is also used in India with a very negative meaning. Police in Jharkhand have used it to describe rules enforced by local Maoists. Another use was in referring to a directive from the Drug Controller General of India’s concerning launches of new drugs.

Diktat is sometimes used in Europe to refer to directives of governments against large groups as in the case of the dispute between the European Union and Microsoft regarding license information on how Windows communicates over a network.

In the Italian press, there is a wide use of diktat to refer to events of the political sphere. The term is used to refer to either union demands against politicians, to the demands of politicians towards its allies to achieve cohesion, or to refer to imposition of rules or acts of various kinds.

Russian President Vladimir Putin has accused the United States of endangering the international order by trying to "remake the whole world" for its own, Putin excoriated the United States for escalating world conflicts by "unilateral diktat" and imposing sanctions that he said were aimed at pushing Russia toward "economic weakness", while he denied that Russia aspires to rebuild an empire or reclaim its Cold War-era stature as a superpower.

References

de:Diktat

Law of war
Treaty of Versailles